[
List of motorcycles of the 1900s to 1909 is a listing of motorcycles of this period, including those on sale, introduced, or otherwise relevant in this period

Motorcycle 

Achilles (1906-1912 motorcycle)
Advance (Australian motorcycle)
Curtiss V-8 motorcycle
Excelsior Motor Manufacturing & Supply Company
Merkel
FN Four (various version produced, 1905-1923)
Harley-Davidson prototype 
Harley-Davidson 1905 model
Harley-Davidson 1907 "Strap-tank" model
Harley-Davidson 1909 V-twin
Indian Single (1903)
Indian Twin (1908)
Indian 1905 "camel-back" single (Hendee)
Laurin & Klement motorcycles
Laurin & Klement 1908 BZ
Marks motorcycle (1896-1901)
California Motor Co. motorcycle (1902-1904)
Motosachoche A1
New Werner (produced until 1908) 
NSU 3 hp (Neckarsulm: NSU Motorenwerke)
Norton Big 4
Perks & Birch Motor-wheel, Singer (1899-1904)
Pierce Four
Reading Standard (1909)
Royal Pioneer (1909) 
Steffy Motor Bike (add-on kit bike)
Thomas Auto-Bi
Thor Model 7 (1908)
Triumph-Motorrad motorcycle (1903)
Yale-California motorcycles by Consolidated Manufacturing (1904-1906)
Yale motorcycle by Consolidated Manufacturing (1906)

Gallery

Tricycle
De Dion-Bouton tricycle (produced 1897 to 1904)
Rochet trike with De Dion engines (1900-1910)
Orient tricycle

See also

Brass Era car
Cyclecars
Ford Model T
Horse and buggy
List of motorcycle manufacturers
List of motorcycles by type of engine
List of motorcycles of the 1890s
List of motorcycles of the 1910s
List of motorcycles of the 1920s
List of motorcycles of the 1930s
List of motorcycles of the 1940s
List of motorized trikes
Quadricycle
Safety bicycle
Timeline of motorized bicycle history

References

Motorcycles introduced in the 1900s
Lists of motorcycles